Matt Kaufmann is a senior research scientist in the department of computer sciences at the University of Texas at Austin, United States. He was a recipient of the 2005 ACM Software System Award along with Robert S. Boyer and J Strother Moore, for his work on the Boyer-Moore Theorem Prover.

References

External links 
 Matt Kaufmann homepage
 

Year of birth missing (living people)
Living people
American computer scientists
University of Texas at Austin faculty
Formal methods people
Lisp (programming language) people